Zophodia penari is a species of snout moth in the genus Zophodia. It was described by Roesler and Küppers in 1981. It is found on Sumatra.

References

Moths described in 1981
Phycitini